Penny A. Weiss is professor at Saint Louis University known for her work on feminist issues.

Education and career 
Weiss has a B.A. from the University of South Florida (1976), an M.A. (1979) and a Ph.D. (1987) from the University of Notre Dame. Starting in 1985 she was an assistant professor at the University of South Carolina, and in 1987 she moved to Purdue University where she remained until 2008. While at Purdue, Weiss spoke out about unequal treatment of women faculty at the university, and the challenges faced by female faculty at Purdue. In 2008 she became a professor at Saint Louis University, where she was chair of the Department of Women's and Gender Studies from 2008 until 2012.

Selected publications

References

External links 
 

Living people
University of South Florida alumni
University of Notre Dame alumni
Saint Louis University faculty
Feminists
Women's studies academics
Gender studies academics
Year of birth missing (living people)